Ole 'Iron Fist' Laursen (born August 21, 1977) is a Filipino-born Danish Welterweight Muay Thai kickboxer and mixed martial artist, he competed in K-1 and in ONE Championship.

Early life
Laursen was born in Manila, Philippines to Danish father and a Spanish-Filipino mother and moved to Denmark with his family when he was two years old. Laursen got involved with martial arts through his older brother Christian, and was 15 when he began training in Muay Thai.

Laursen currently lives in Ubon Ratchatani, Thailand and fights out of his own Legacy Gym.

Laursen trained with Peter J McCarthy, the subject, director and producer of the documentary, Fight of Flight which won "Best Foreign Documentary" at the Long Island Film Festival, New York as well as three other "Best Documentary" awards at festivals in Hamburg, Toronto and California. Laursen assisted the production team in Ubon Ratchatani.

Kickboxing / K-1 / Muay Thai career

As an amateur Laursen had six fights before turning professional. He lost his first amateur bout, took a year off, and then came back with five straight wins – all by knockout, winning the 1998 Danish amateur kickboxing title in the process. He made his professional debut in 2000 and picked up his first major honour that summer, defeating Eval Denton to win the I.K.F. European title.  Laursen relocated from Europe to San Diego in the United States, where he won the vacant I.M.T.C. Championship in 2001.  However, he was unable to defend his title later on that year, losing a controversial decision to the Thai fighter Kongnapa in what many thought was a Laursen victory.

In 2002 Laursen made his first appearance for the K-1 organization at the K-1 World MAX 2002 USA in Denver, Colorado, where he made the final only to lose to U.S rival Duane Ludwig.  This defeat meant that Laursen was unable to participate in the inaugural K-1 MAX final but he made up somewhat for that defeat by winning the prestigious King's Cup in Bangkok, Thailand at the end of the year.  In 2003 Laursen signed up with the newly formed European promotion SuperLeague where he faced Shane Chapman on his debut only to lose by decision. Despite this defeat Laursen had some initial success in SuperLeague with his Muay Thai style favouring five-round matches, going 4 and 2 with the organization by the end of 2004 and beating world champions such as Peter Crooke and Kamal El Amrani.

Over the following years Laursen spent much of his fighting time flicking back and forth between SuperLeague and K-1, although the increased competition (and shorter fight times introduced by SuperLeague) meant that he had little success with either promotion – finishing with an overall record of 4-5 SuperLeague, and 2-6 in K-1.

He returned to kickboxing to face pound-for-pound great Giorgio Petrosyan in Trieste, Italy on March 2, 2013. Severely overmatched, he was dropped with a knee to the liver before being knocked out with a left high kick immediately after in round one.

Boxing career
Laursen had a trial with the Philippines National Boxing Team and was accepted but decided to move to Thailand instead of staying in the Philippines to pursue a career in boxing.

Mixed martial arts career
Laursen made his professional MMA debut in 2006 and had two fights with the K-1 Hero's promotion in Japan. He lost his first fight against Genki Sudo by decision and his second fight to Caol Uno by third round submission. Laursen was suffering from a knee injury and was not able to train properly for the fight with Uno.

Laursen did not begin to fight MMA regularly again until 2010 because he was focused on his K-1 and Muay Thai career, a decision he has subsequently said he regrets. His next two fights were both in China, with Laursen submitting Liu Guang Yao in 2007 and knocking out Shawn David in 2009.

In 2010 he signed with ESPN Star Sports promotion Martial Combat in Singapore. He defeated Eduardo Pachu in the third round of their five-round 'super fight' at Martial Combat 1. His second fight was against Nick LeConte at Martial Combat 8 and Laursen won by majority decision in a controversial decision. His final fight for Martial Combat was against Malaysian Muay Thai champion Jian Kai Chee at Martial Combat 12 and Laursen won by TKO in the first round.

In November 2010 MMA website Bloody Elbow ranked Laursen number eight on a list of the top lightweight prospects in the world.

ONE Fighting Championship
On July 15, 2011 it was announced that Laursen had signed with One Fighting Championship. On July 18 it was announced that Laursen would be facing fellow Filipino Eduard Folayang at ONE Fighting Championship: Champion vs. Champion at the Singapore Indoor Stadium on September 3. On August 17, 2011 it was announced that Laursen had injured his knee in training and would be unable to fight Folayang at ONE Fighting Championship: Champion vs. Champion. He was replaced by South Korean fighter A Sol Kwon.

On February 4, 2012 it was announced that Laursen would be facing Felipe Enomoto at ONE Fighting Championship: Battle of Heroes in Jakarta, Indonesia on February 11, 2012. He lost the fight via submission in the second round.

Championships and Accomplishments

Kickboxing
2002 King's Cup Muay Thai Champion -70 kg
2002 K-1 World MAX USA runner up -70 kg
2001 I.M.T.C. Muay Thai Super Welterweight World Champion -70 kg
2000 I.K.F. Pro Muay Thai European Champion -70 kg
1998 Danish Amateur Kickboxing Champion

MMA
Martial Combat
2010 Martial Combat Superfight Lightweight Champion -73 kg
ONE Fighting Championship
Fight of the Night (1 Time)

Fight record 

|- bgcolor="#FFBBBB"
| 2013-03-02 || Loss ||align=left| Giorgio Petrosyan || Gotti Promotions || Trieste, Italy|| KO (left high kick) || 1 || 2:10 
|-
|- bgcolor="#CCFFCC"
| 2013-01-25 || Win ||align=left| Local thai fighter || Fight Night || Ubon Ratchatani, Thailand || KO (Legkick) || 1 ||
|-
|- bgcolor="#CCFFCC"
| 2013-01-11 || Win ||align=left| Local thai fighter || Fight Night || Ubon Ratchatani, Thailand || KO (Bodyshoot) || 2 ||
|-
|- bgcolor="#FFBBBB"
| 2008-06-14 || Loss ||align=left| Jiri Zak || Eight Brawl, Quarter Finals || Copenhagen, Denmark || Ref stopped fight (Leg Injury) || 3 ||
|-
|- bgcolor="#FFBBBB"
| 2008-05-31 || Loss ||align=left| Virgil Kalakoda || K-1 Scandinavia MAX 2008, Super Fight || Stockholm, Sweden || Ext.R Decision (Unanimous) || 4 || 3:00
|-
|- bgcolor="#FFBBBB"
| 2007-06-28 || Loss ||align=left| Andy Souwer || K-1 World MAX 2007 Final Elimination || Tokyo, Japan || TKO (Foot injury) || 1 || 2:07
|-
! style=background:white colspan=9 |
|-
|- bgcolor="#FFBBBB"
| 2007-04-04 || Loss ||align=left| Masato || K-1 World MAX 2007 World Elite Showcase || Yokohama, Japan || Decision (Unanimous) || 3 || 3:00
|-
|- bgcolor="#FFBBBB"
| 2006-09-24 || Loss ||align=left| Buakaw Por. Pramuk || K-1 MAX North European Qualification, Super Fight || Stockholm, Sweden || TKO (Ref Stop/Left Hook) || 2 || 2:49
|-
|- bgcolor="#CCFFCC"
| 2006-05-20 || Win ||align=left| Jean-Charles Skarbowsky || K-1 Scandinavia Grand Prix 2006 || Stockholm, Sweden || Ext.R Decision (Unanimous) || 4 || 3:00
|-
|- bgcolor="#FFBBBB"
| 2006-04-05 || Loss ||align=left| Gago Drago || K-1 World MAX 2006 World Tournament Open || Tokyo, Japan || Decision (Unanimous) || 3 || 3:00
|-
! style=background:white colspan=9 |
|-
|- bgcolor="#FFBBBB"
| 2006-01-14 || Loss ||align=left| Farid Villaume || The Night of the Superfights III || Villebon-sur-Yvette, France || KO || 2 || 
|-
|- bgcolor="#FFBBBB"
| 2005-10-22 || Loss ||align=left| Foad Sadeghi || SuperLeague Heavy Knockout 2005 || Vienna, Austria || Decision || 3 || 3:00
|-
|- bgcolor="#FFBBBB"
| 2005-09-24 || Loss ||align=left| Ali Gunyar || SuperLeague Turkey 2005, Quarter Finals || Tokyo, Japan || Decision || 3 || 3:00
|-
|- bgcolor="#FFBBBB"
| 2005-04-09 || Loss ||align=left| José Reis || SuperLeague Austria 2005 || Vienna, Austria || Decision || 5 || 3:00
|-
|- bgcolor="#FFBBBB"
| 2005-01-23 || Loss ||align=left| Hiroki Shishido || Shoot Boxing Ground Zero || Fukuoka, Japan || KO (Right High Kick) || 3 || 0:22
|-
|- bgcolor="#CCFFCC"
| 2004-10-22 || Win ||align=left| Kamal El Amrani || SuperLeague Germany 2004 || Oberhausen, Germany || KO (Knees) || 5 || 
|-
|- bgcolor="#FFBBBB"
| 2004-09-19 || Loss ||align=left| Andy Souwer || S-Cup 2004, Quarter Finals || Yokohama, Japan || TKO (Ref Stop) || 1 || 2:37
|-
|- bgcolor="#CCFFCC"
| 2004-05-22 || Win ||align=left| Fadi Merza || SuperLeague Switzerland 2004 || Winterthur, Switzerland || Decision || 5 || 3:00
|-
|- bgcolor="#FFBBBB"
| 2004-03-30 || Loss ||align=left| Gregory Swerts || SuperLeague Italy 2004 || Padova, Italy || Decision || 5 || 3:00
|-
|- bgcolor="#FFBBBB"
| 2004-03-04 || Loss ||align=left| Nuengtrakarn Por.Muang Ubon || S1 World Championships 2004, Quarter Finals || Bangkok, Thailand || Decision || 3 || 3:00
|-
|- bgcolor="#CCFFCC"
| 2003-12-06 || Win ||align=left| Fadi Merza || SuperLeague Netherlands 2003 || Rotterdam, Netherlands || Decision || 5 || 3:00
|-
|- bgcolor="#CCFFCC"
| 2003-09-27 || Win ||align=left| Peter Crooke || SuperLeague Germany 2003 || Wuppertal, Germany || TKO || 2 || 
|-
|- bgcolor="#FFBBBB"
| 2003-05-10 || Loss ||align=left| Shane Chapman || SuperLeague Austria 2003 || Vienna, Austria || Decision || 5 || 3:00
|-
|- bgcolor="#FFBBBB"
| 2003-03-15 || Loss ||align=left| Jomhod Kiatadisak || K-1 World GP 2003 Scandinavia || Stockholm, Sweden || Decision || 3 || 3:00
|-
|- bgcolor="#CCFFCC"
| 2003-02-15 || Win ||align=left| Imro Main || VF3 - Rumble in the West || Aarhus, Denmark || Decision || 5 || 3:00
|-
|- bgcolor="#CCFFCC"
| 2002-12-05 || Win ||align=left| Faisal Zakaria || King's Birthday 2002, Final || Bangkok, Thailand || KO || 2 || 
|-
! style=background:white colspan=9 |
|-
|- bgcolor="#CCFFCC"
| 2002-12-05 || Win ||align=left| Florin Vintilă || King's Birthday 2002, Semi Finals || Bangkok, Thailand || KO || 1 || 
|-
|- bgcolor="#FFBBBB"
| 2002-03-15 || Loss ||align=left| Duane Ludwig || K-1 World MAX 2002 USA, Final || Denver, Colorado, USA || Ext.R Decision (Unanimous) || 4 || 3:00
|-
! style=background:white colspan=9 |
|-
|- bgcolor="#CCFFCC"
| 2002-03-15 || Win ||align=left| Jason Jillian || K-1 World MAX 2002 USA, Semi Finals || Denver, Colorado, USA || KO (Punch) || 1 || 0:43
|-
|- bgcolor="#CCFFCC"
| 2001-10-12 || Win ||align=left| BM Sasiprappa || Warriors Cup 4 || Culver City, California, USA || KO || || 
|-
|- bgcolor="#FFBBBB"
| 2001-06-03 || Loss ||align=left| Kongnapa Watcharawit|| Warriors Cup 3 || Burbank, California, USA || Decision (Split) || 5 || 3:00
|-
! style=background:white colspan=9 |
|-
|- bgcolor="#CCFFCC"
| 2001-02-25 || Win ||align=left| Khunpon Dechkampu || Warriors Cup 2 || Burbank, California, USA || Decision (Unanimous) || 5 || 3:00
|-
! style=background:white colspan=9 |
|-
|- bgcolor="#CCFFCC"
| 2000-06-29 || Win ||align=left| Eval Denton || I.K.F. Night of Champions || St Helens, England, UK || Decision (Unanimous) || 5 || 3:00
|-
! style=background:white colspan=9 |
|-
|- bgcolor="#FFBBBB"
| 2000-04-15 || Loss ||align=left| Petri Martinez || || Copenhagen, Denmark || TKO || 3 || 
|-
|-
| colspan=9 | Legend:

Mixed martial arts record

|-
|Win
|align=center|8–4
|Cheik Kone 
|KO (punch)
|KFWC World Cup
|
|align=center|1
|align=center|N/A
|Ningxiang, China
|
|-
|Win
|align=center|7–4
|Ansagan Kuseinov 
|Submission (Kimura)
|Art of War 16
|
|align=center|1
|align=center|N/A
|Beijing, China
|
|-
|Loss
|align=center|6–4
|Joe Ray
|Submission (guillotine choke)
|Dare Fight Sports: Rebels of MMA
|
|align=center|3
|align=center|N/A
|Bangkok, Thailand
|
|-
|Win
|align=center|6–3
|Eduard Folayang
|Decision (split)
|ONE FC: War of the Lions
|
|align=center|3
|align=center|5:00
|Kallang, Singapore
|
|-
|Loss
|align=center|5–3
|Felipe Enomoto
|Submission (rear-naked choke) 
|ONE FC: Battle of Heroes
|
|align=center|2
|align=center|3:49
|Jakarta, Indonesia
|
|-
|Win
|align=center|5–2
|Jian Kai Chee
|TKO (punches)
|Martial Combat 12
|
|align=center|1
|align=center|2:18
|Sentosa, Singapore
|
|-
|Win
|align=center|4–2
|Nick LeConte
|Decision (majority)
|Martial Combat 8
|
|align=center|3
|align=center|5:00
|Sentosa, Singapore
|
|-
|Win
|align=center|3–2
|Eduardo Pachu
|Submission (rear-naked choke)
|Martial Combat 1
|
|align=center|3
|align=center|0:50
|Sentosa, Singapore
|Won Martial Combat Lightweight Championship
|-
|Win
|align=center|2–2
|Shawn David
|KO (punch)
|AOW 12: Invincible
|
|align=center|1
|align=center|3:39
|Beijing, China
|
|-
|Win
|align=center|1–2
|Liu Guang Yao
|Submission (rear-naked choke)
|AOW 9: Fists of Fury
|
|align=center|1
|align=center|5:27
|Beijing, China
|
|-
|Loss
|align=center|0–2
|Caol Uno
|Submission (rear-naked choke)
|Hero's 5
|
|align=center|2
|align=center|4:36
|Tokyo, Japan
|Hero's 2006 Lightweight Grand Prix opening round.
|-
|Loss
|align=center|0–1
|Genki Sudo
|Decision (unanimous)
|Hero's 4
|
|align=center|3
|align=center|5:00
|Tokyo, Japan
|
|-

See also
 List of male kickboxers

External links
Fight or Flight official movie page

References

1977 births
Living people
Danish male kickboxers
Welterweight kickboxers
Danish male mixed martial artists
Lightweight mixed martial artists
Mixed martial artists utilizing Muay Thai
Danish Muay Thai practitioners
Sportspeople from Copenhagen
People from Manila
Danish people of Filipino descent
Filipino people of Danish descent